BML-190 (Indomethacin morpholinylamide) is a drug used in scientific research that acts as a selective CB2 inverse agonist. BML-190 is structurally derived from the NSAID indomethacin but has a quite different biological activity. The activity produced by this compound is disputed, with some sources referring to it as a CB2 agonist rather than an inverse agonist; this may reflect an error in classification, or alternatively it may produce different effects in different tissues, and more research is required to resolve this dispute.

Lead optimization of the parent structure resulted in L-768,242 & L-759,787.

References 

Cannabinoids
4-Morpholinyl compunds
Indole ethers at the benzene ring
Benzamides
Chloroarenes
Tryptamines